Herbulotiana altitudinella is a moth in the family Depressariidae. It was described by Pierre Viette in 1963. It is known from Madagascar.

This species has a wingspan of 24-26mm for the male and 38–41 mm for the female. 
The forewings are greyish, with white and black markings.

References

Moths described in 1963
Herbulotiana
Taxa named by Pierre Viette